Kyle McDuffie is a Canadian former long jumper who won a bronze medal at the 1986 Commonwealth Games in Edinburgh, Scotland. McDuffie won the Canadian national championships in 1985 and 1987. In 1987, he came second in a long jump event in Vancouver, British Columbia, Canada.

References

Year of birth missing (living people)
Living people
Canadian male long jumpers
Athletes (track and field) at the 1986 Commonwealth Games
Commonwealth Games medallists in athletics
Commonwealth Games bronze medallists for Canada
Medallists at the 1986 Commonwealth Games